Dewy Rose is a census-designated place and unincorporated community in Elbert County, Georgia, United States. Its population was 161 as of the 2020 census. Dewy Rose has a post office with ZIP code 30634. Georgia State Route 17 passes through the community.

Demographics

History
A post office called Dewy Rose has been in operation since 1882. According to tradition, the community was named for the dewy rose the postmaster's daughter found.

References

Populated places in Elbert County, Georgia
Census-designated places in Georgia (U.S. state)